Kalamandalam Venmani Haridas (15 September 1946 – 17 September 2005) was an Indian Kathakali musician noted for his rendition of the Kathakali padams (playback songs) for the characters in the classical Kerala dance-drama.Born in Venmani Mana, a Namboodiri mansion of literary repute in Vellarappilly village east of Aluva off Kochi, Haridas developed interest in Kathakali by watching performances of the classical dance-drama in the neighbouring Akavoor Mana.  He was taught the basics in music by Mundakkal Sankara Varrier. He learned ´padams´ from stories like Rugmini Swayamvaram and Kuchela Vritham.

Early life 

In 1960, he joined Kerala Kalamandalam and learned music under leading Kathakali musicians like Kalamandalam Neelakantan Nambisan, Sivaraman Nair and Kalamandalam Gangadharan Nair. He was the first student of Kalamandalam Gangadharan when the latter became a teacher in the institution. Haridas was known as a very talented student during his stay in Kalamandalam. Kalamandalam Sankaran Embranthiri, Madambi Subramanian Namboodiri, Kalamandalam Hyderali and Kalamandalam Subrahmanyan were immediate seniors to Haridas in the Kathakali Music section. In 1968, completing the course in Kalamandalam he joined Darpana, a noted performing arts institute set up by the famous danseuse Mrinalini Sarabhai in Ahmedabad, as a music teacher. This stint beyond the Vindhyas exposed him to various styles of north Indian renditions, including classical Hindustani music, which in later years will become a mounted musical backup for his innovations as a kathakali singer. A decade later, in 1978, Haridas fulfilled his ambition to get back to his home state for good when he was offered the post of music teacher at Margi in Thiruvananthapuram, where he subsequently worked for three decades.

Education and later life
Haridas, on his return to the world of Kathakali, began as shinkiti (ശിങ്കിടി - accompanist singer) on stage, primarily under star musician Embranthiri, who groomed him. But eventually his melodious voice, clear enunciation of lyrics and support from friends and senior colleagues like Hyderali brought out his potential of rising to an eminent lead singer. He retained the essential emotion-laden Sopanam style of Kathakali music rendition even while infusing in it the microtone-heavy voice culture of the south Indian classical Carnatic music. The most important fact, on analyzing his musical career is the importance he has given to the characterization in kathakali, the emotional quality and depth to the ´'vachikam´', as it is observed, to achieve this will be the most challenging for any future kathakali singer. And he played a role in Shaji N Karun movie Vanaprastham as kathakali singer for Mohanlal's Kunjukuttan.
In his heyday, Haridas was one of the favorite vocal accompanists of masters like Kalamandalam Gopi, Kalamandalam Ramankutty Nair, Kottakkal Sivaraman and Kalamandalam Vasu Pisharody.

Acting 
Haridas has acted in two Malayalam feature films, Swaham and Vanaprastham, both directed by Shaji N. Karun & Bosco, Shayanam.  He has also appeared in a few television serials like Neermathalam Poothakalam written by Kamala Surayya.

Death 
Haridas died of an acute liver problem in a hospital in Thiruvananthapuram.

Family
Haridas is survived by his wife Saraswathi and two sons – actor Sarath Das and Harith.

Work on Haridas
A biography of Haridas, titled Bhava Gayakan, has been published by Rainbow Books. Dr. N.P. Vijayakrishnan is the author. The 2012 documentary film 'Chitharanjini: Remembering the Maestro', is focused on the musical life of Haridas.
Chitharanjini is a documentary film made on the musical life of the Kathakali of Venmani Haridas directed by Ratheesh.

References

External links 

 List of kathakalipadams sung by Venmani Haridas from kathakalipadam.com: A  comprehensive database for kathakali music with streaming

1946 births
2005 deaths
Kathakali exponents
Singers from Kochi
20th-century Indian singers
Male actors in Malayalam cinema
Indian male film actors
Male actors from Kochi
20th-century Indian male actors
Indian male television actors
20th-century Indian male singers